The chief of the United States Army Reserve (CAR) is the commanding officer of the United States Army Reserve, the reserve component of the United States Army. As the highest-ranking officer in the United States Army Reserve, the CAR is the principal advisor to the chief of staff of the Army on all matters relating to the Army Reserve, and is responsible for the personnel, operations and construction budgets of the Army Reserve, subject to the supervision and control of the secretary of the Army. Dual-hatted as Commanding General, United States Army Reserve Command, the CAR is also responsible to the Commanding General, United States Army Forces Command for the oversight of operationally-deployed Army Reserve forces.

By statute, the CAR is a member of the Army Staff, as well as one of five Army Reserve members of the Reserve Forces Policy Board. The CAR is also designated by statute as the executive agent for the Full Time Support Program, a personnel program under the Department of Defense. The Chief's headquarters is the Office of the Chief of Army Reserve, housed at Fort Bragg, North Carolina.

The 33rd and current Chief of the Army Reserve is Lieutenant General Jody J. Daniels, the first woman to lead the Army Reserve as well as an Army service component command.

Appointment and rank

As an officer's appointment in the United States Armed Forces, the nominee requires confirmation by the United States Senate by majority vote. The chief of Army Reserve is nominated for appointment by the president of the United States with the advice and/or recommendation of the secretary of defense and secretary of the Army, as well as a determination from the chairman of the Joint Chiefs of Staff that the nominee has had significant joint duty experience.

Until 1968, the office of the Chief of the Army Reserve was not set by statute due to concerns that institutionalizing a commander of Army reserve forces would separate it from the Regular Army, much like how the Militia Act of 1903 had rendered the early National Guard independent from the Regular Army.

The CAR's rank was initially that of major in 1923, and was successively raised to colonel in 1924, to brigadier general in 1933 (making Charles D. Herron the first CAR to hold general officer rank), and to major general in 1950. The CAR's rank, alongside those of reserve leaders of other service branches, was raised to lieutenant general in the National Defense Authorization Act of 2001, making Thomas J. Plewes, then chief of Army Reserve, the first to hold three-star rank. The statutory requirement for the CAR to hold the rank of lieutenant general was repealed in the 2017 NDAA, but the officeholder is still appointed to that rank.

The CAR serves for a four-year term, which can be renewed once for a total of eight years.

List of officeholders

See also
Office of the Chief of Army Reserve
Chief of the National Guard Bureau
Vice Chief of the National Guard Bureau
Army National Guard

References

Sources

United States Army Reserve
United States Army organization
Chief of Reserve
1923 establishments in the United States